Red Bank may refer to:

Places
Belize
Red Bank, Belize, a village in Stann Creek District, Belize

Canada
Red Bank, New Brunswick, a rural community in Northumberland County

United States
Red Bank, California
Red Bank, Indiana
Red Bank, Missouri
Red Bank, New Jersey, in Monmouth County
Red Bank, Gloucester County, New Jersey
Battle of Red Bank, in the above community
Red Bank, South Carolina
Red Bank, Tennessee

See also

Redbank (disambiguation)
Red Banks (disambiguation)